Mabompré is a village of Wallonia and a district of the municipality of Houffalize, located in the province of Luxembourg, Belgium.

It was a municipality until 1977.

History 

Under the French regime, Mabompré fused with Randoux.

In 1823, it fused with the municipality of Vellereux, which at the same time under the French regime fused with Bonnerue, Engreux, Rafsaday, Rensiwez and Spitanche.

People 

 Albin-Georges Terrien set the plots of his novels in the villages of Bonnerue and Engreux.

Former municipalities of Luxembourg (Belgium)
Houffalize